Stony Ridge is a census-designated place (CDP) in northwestern Troy Township, Wood County, Ohio, United States. As of the 2010 census, it had a population of 411. It has a post office with the ZIP code 43463.

History
Stony Ridge was platted in 1872, and named for the stony terrain of the original town site. A post office called Stony Ridge has been in operation since 1837.

Geography
It is located along the concurrent U.S. Routes 20 and 23, at Stony Ridge Road and East Broadway. It contains a branch of the Pemberville Public Library, a community park, Stony Ridge United Methodist Church, and St. John's Lutheran Church.

Demographics

References

Census-designated places in Wood County, Ohio